Qi Pao is a Thai lakorn that aired on Channel 3. It features Ann Thongprasom as Paeka (Pink) and Krissada Pornveroj as Zhao Ming Tian.

Synopsis
Paeka (Ann Thongprasom) a tall hardworking woman is working at the Asian Institute of Textile and Apparel in Thailand as a Thai curator. One day she met Zhao Ming Tian (Krissada Pornweroj), also known as Daniel, a handsome Chinese man and the son of Zhao Wen Yue (Nirut Sirijanya) who is the owner of the 30 qipao dresses that were presented for an exhibition. One of the qipao dresses in the exhibition belonged to Zhao Ming Tian's recently deceased wife, of whom Paeka bears an uncanny resemblance. Paeka is invited to Hong Kong by the family to investigate Wang Lee's murder.

Cast

Main Role 
Ann Thongprasom as Paeka Supatkul (Pink) /May Lee (Sukonta, Mei Li)
Smart Krissada Pornweroj as Zhao Ming Tian, also known as Daniel, The second young master of Zhao family.

Supporting Cast 

Nirut Sirijanya (Ning) as Zhao Wen Yue, absolutely-power leader of Zhao Family, he also the founding father of Zhao pharmacy industrial. 
Chintara Sukapatana (Mam) as Wang Li Ping, The First mistress of Zhao Wen Yue.
Pitchanart Sakakorn (May) as Zhao Lin Pei, Zhao Wen Yue's Adopted daughter. She felt in love with Zhao Ming Tian. 
Panadda Wongphudee (Boom) as Lin Mei Ying, a former night club beautiful singer who became a second mistress of Zhao Wen Yue.
Anuchit Sapanpong (Oh) as Liang Wei He, a stealthy intelligent homeless.
Pijittra Siriwetchapan (Jieb) as Yang Yu Lian , Wife of Wang Jun Zhen.
Anuwat Niwatwong (Poo) as Wang Jun Zhen, The younger brother of Wang Li Ping, Wang Yu Lian's husband.
Deejai Deedeedee (Pad thai) as Xiu Lan, Chief of Zhao family maid and household keeper.
Pecky Sritanya as Bao Lin, Lin Mei Ying and  Zhao Lin Pei's close-assistant maid.
Worawut Niyomsup (Oat) as Zhao Ming Shan (）
Suprawat PratamaSutra as A Hua, The greatest qipao crafter, Xiu Lan's father.
Suchao Pongwilai as Li Xian, a former red guards soldier.
Tassaneewan Seniwong Na Ayuddhaya as Auntie Zhi, Old poor women in fishermen village, Liang Wei He's mother.   
Teerapong Liaorakwong as Tantai, Paeka's uncle who has unordinary vision skill.
Panleka Wanmuang as Paeka's mother.

Cameo (historical figure) 
Mao Zedong
Aisin-Gioro Puyi
Empress Wanrong

Awards

References

Thai television soap operas
2010s Thai television series
2012 Thai television series debuts
2012 Thai television series endings
Channel 3 (Thailand) original programming